The Tongue of the Ocean (TOTO) is the name of a region of much deeper water in the Bahamas separating the islands of Andros and New Providence.

Features

Its only exposure to the open ocean is at the northern end. Except for the northern ocean opening, the TOTO is surrounded by numerous islands, reefs, and shoals which make a peripheral shelter isolating it from ocean disturbances, particularly high ambient noise.

This channel and the Providence Channels are the two main branches of the Great Bahama Canyon, a submerged geological feature formed by erosion during periods of lower sea level.  During their early history the Tongue of the Ocean and the Providence Channel were broad, relatively shallow basins flanked by growing carbonate banks.  As the Blake-Bahama platform subsided, sedimentation kept pace with subsidence on the banks, but not in the basins.

See also
 Geography of the Bahamas
 Atlantic Undersea Test and Evaluation Center
 Andros Island

References

Oceanic trenches of the Atlantic Ocean
Landforms of the Bahamas